Xiaoming Wang is a Chinese-born American vertebrate paleontologist and geologist who lives and teaches in the United States.

Areas of expertise
Professor Wang specializes in the fossil evolution, systematics, and phylogeny of mammals of the Cenozoic. He has researched the biostratigraphy of Inner Mongolia and Asia as a whole, the geochronology of Asia, paleoenvironments of the Tibetan Plateau, and mammalian migrations between Eurasia and North America.  Wang has also investigated the systematics and phylogeny of canids (dogs and their kin) as well as Late Eocene through Pleistocene fossil mammals of Southern California and Mexico. (see Natural History Museum of LA).

Education
B.S. Nanjing University, Nanjing, Jiangsu province, PRC.
Chinese Academy of Sciences, Institute of Vertebrate Paleontology and Paleoanthropology in Beijing, PRC.
M.A. and Ph.D., University of Kansas, Lawrence, Kansas, United States.
Post-doctoral work, American Museum of Natural History.
Assistant Professor, Long Island University, New York.

Professional life
Wang is a curator in the Department of Vertebrate Paleontology at the Natural History Museum of Los Angeles County and Natural History Museum. Wang is also a contributing researcher of the Paleobiology Database created by John Alroy, Ph.D.

Research
The Origin and Evolution of the Dog Family
Hesperocyoninae, Borophaginae.
Other Families of Carnivora.
Paleoenvironment of the Tibetan Plateau.
Biostratigraphy of Inner Mongolia.
Neogene Terrestrial Mammalian Biostratigraphy and Chronology in Asia.

Grants
U.S. National Science Foundation, National Natural Science Foundation of China, Chinese Academy of Sciences, and the U.S. National Geographic Society.

Publications
Society of Vertebrate Paleontology

Wang is also co-author, with American Museum of Natural History paleontologist, Richard H. Tedford of a popular book Dogs: Their Fossil Relatives and Evolutionary History, based upon their research on fossils of the Canidae.

References

Wang, Xiaoming; and Tedford, Richard H. Dogs: Their Fossil Relatives and Evolutionary History. New York: Columbia University Press, 2008.

21st-century American geologists
American paleontologists
Chinese emigrants to the United States
Chinese geologists
Chinese paleontologists
Living people
Long Island University faculty
Nanjing University alumni
Place of birth missing (living people)
University of Kansas alumni
1955 births